Nippon Safes Inc. is a point-and-click adventure game developed by Italian developer Dynabyte. It was released in 1992 for MS-DOS and Amiga computers. The game is the predecessor to The Big Red Adventure and features cartoonish, comics-style graphics and a unique icon-based interface. In 2021 the game was declared freeware by the original authors of the game.

Gameplay 
Nippon Safes Inc. is notable for its engine, the "Parallaction" system. This system allows players to control three different heroes – Doug, a smart safe cracker; Dino, a strong but dumb boxer; and Donna, a sexy club dancer. Players can choose to play as any of these characters or all three, as each character has their own story to follow and puzzles to solve. The stories of the three characters intersect at certain points, but players can also choose to focus on just one character if they prefer. The gameplay has been compared to Lucasarts' Day of the Tentacle, which was released one year later.

Reception 

Overall, Nippon Safes Inc. received positive reviews for its humorous writing, clever puzzles, and innovative use of the Parallaction system.

References

External links 

 
 Review at Hardcore Gaming 101

1992 video games
Adventure games
Amiga games
DOS games
Point-and-click adventure games
ScummVM-supported games
Video games developed in Italy
Video games featuring female protagonists